Those Were the Days is a 1934 British comedy film directed by Thomas Bentley and starring Will Hay, Iris Hoey and John Mills. It was based on Arthur Wing Pinero's 1885 farce The Magistrate and was the first of two Hay movies based on Pinero's plays, the other being Dandy Dick. The film also features music hall acts of the time – acts of a type rarely committed to film. It is primarily remembered as Will Hay's first major screen role.

The film was produced and released by British International Pictures and was shot at the company's Elstree Studios. The film's sets were designed by the art director Duncan Sutherland.

Plot summary
The strait-laced magistrate Brutus Poskett (Will Hay) is concerned that his wife (Iris Hoey) may be older than he believes her to be, especially as his young stepson (John Mills) seems very precocious for an apparently fifteen-year-old boy.

Mrs Poskett tries to stop an impending visit from her first husband's friend (Claud Allister), who knows her true age, by confronting him at a local music hall.  However, unbeknown to her, Poskett has also been persuaded to go to the music hall with his "adolescent" stepson and, in an ensuing melée Poskett's wife and her sister are arrested.

The following day, Poskett sentences both to seven days imprisonment, failing to recognise them as they are heavily veiled.

Cast
 Will Hay as Magistrate Brutus Poskett
 Iris Hoey as Agatha Poskett
 Angela Baddeley as Charlotte
 Claud Allister as Capt. Horace Vale
 George Graves as Col. Alexander Lukyn
 John Mills as Bobby
 Jane Carr as Minnie Taylor
 Marguerite Allan as Eve Douglas
 H. F. Maltby as Mr. Bullamy
 Laurence Hanray as Wormington
 Syd Crossley as Wyke
 Wally Patch as Insp. Briggs
 Jimmy Godden as Pat Maloney

References

External links
 
 

1934 films
Films shot at British International Pictures Studios
1930s English-language films
British black-and-white films
Films directed by Thomas Bentley
British historical comedy films
1930s historical comedy films
Films set in the 1880s
Films set in London
1930s British films
British films based on plays